Baiyun Mountain, also known as White Cloud Mountain, is a mountain located a few miles to the north of Guangzhou, China.

Name
Báiyún is Mandarin Chinese for "White Clouds", derived from views of the mountain's peaks shrouded in mist during late Spring or after a rain. Its former English name, Pakwan, is a form of the Cantonese pronunciation of the same name.

Baiyun is informally known as the "City's Lung", from its greenery. It is also acclaimed as the "First Beauty in Guangzhou” or the “Most Famous Mountain South of Ling”. Moxing Peak, its highest point, is similarly sometimes called the “First Peak under the Southern Sky”.

History

Baiyun Mountain has been famed as a scenic spot since ancient times. Its visitors predated the foundation of Panyu (now Guangzhou) in 214 BC, with various celebrities of the Warring States period (5th–3rd centuries BC) known to have traveled there. Its beauty was again celebrated during the 3rd–5th century Jin Dynasty and the 7th–9th century Tang. Since the Song, various scenes at Baiyun have been named among the Eight Sights of Ram City, lists of Guangzhou's loveliest spots. However, few of the historical sites have survived to the present day and others—such as the view of Guangzhou's old walled city at dusk—have changed drastically as the city has expanded to and around the mountain.

Gallery

Wildlife 
The White Cloud Mountain minnow, now a popular aquarium fish worldwide, was discovered in this area in the 1930s.

References

External links
 Official website

Mountains of Guangdong
Baiyun District, Guangzhou
Tourist attractions in Guangzhou